Giorgi Chubinashvili (November 21, 1885 – January 14, 1973) was a Georgian art historian.

Born in St. Petersburg, Russia he studied psychology at the universities of Leipzig and Halle (1907–12), and Georgian-Armenian-Persian philology at the Petrograd University (1916–17). Returning to Georgia, he served as a professor at the Tbilisi State University (1918–31, 1937–48). He was one of the founding fathers and the first rector of Tbilisi State Academy of Arts (former Fine Arts (1922–28). From 1941 until his death, he directed the Institute of the History of Georgian Arts at the Georgian Academy of Sciences (now the National Centre for Georgian Art History and Heritage Preservation) which has been named after him. His works are chiefly focused on medieval Georgian and Armenian architecture, as well as on wall painting and sculpture.

References 
George Chubinashvili. National Centre for Georgian Art History and Heritage Preservation. Accessed on September 16, 2007.

1885 births
1973 deaths
Art historians
20th-century historians from Georgia (country)
Academic staff of Tbilisi State University
Leipzig University alumni
Martin Luther University of Halle-Wittenberg alumni
Academic staff of the Tbilisi State Academy of Arts
Members of the Georgian National Academy of Sciences
Expatriates from the Russian Empire in Germany